Rhynchodipterus is a genus of prehistoric lungfish that lived during the late Devonian period.

References 

Prehistoric lungfish genera
Late Devonian animals
Late Devonian fish
Devonian bony fish
Fossils of Greenland
Fossils of Great Britain